Rizzo  is a surname of Italian origin, denoting a person with curly hair or a variation of the surnames Ricci and Risso.

Geographical distribution
As of 2014, 55.1% of all known bearers of the surname Rizzo were residents of Italy (frequency 1:786), 18.2% of the United States (1:14,059), 7.9% of Brazil (1:18,357), 5.1% of Argentina (1:5,960), 3.3% of Ecuador (1:3,422), 2.4% of France (1:19,532), 1.1% of Belgium (1:7,505), 1.0% of Canada (1:27,097) and 0.01% of Corfu, Greece (1:10).

In Italy, the frequency of the surname was higher than national average (1:786) in the following regions:
 1. Sicily (1:234)
 2. Apulia (1:261)
 3. Calabria (1:374)
 4. Veneto (1:699) 

In Ecuador, the frequency of the surname was higher than national average (1:3,422) in the following provinces:
 1. Los Ríos Province (1:694)
 2. Guayas Province (1:1,410)
 3. Galápagos Province (1:2,098)
 4. El Oro Province  (1:3,237)

People
Notable people with this surname include:
 Francesco Rizzo da Santacroce (1505-1545), Italian painter, active mainly in Bergamo and Venice
 Adam Rizzo, American founder of the Solar Liberty
 Alanna Rizzo, American sports reporter
 Alberto Rizzo, fashion photographer and painter
 Alberto Rizzo (footballer) (born 1993), Italian football player
 Aldo Rizzo (1935-2021), Italian politician and magistrate
 Alessandro Minuto-Rizzo (born 1940), Italian diplomat, former Deputy Secretary General of NATO
 Alex Rizzo (1968-2002), American professional wrestler
 Alfredo Rizzo (1902-1991), French-born Italian actor, screenwriter and director
 Alfredo Rizzo (athlete) (born 1933), former Italian middle-distance runner
 Angelo Rizzo (1926-2008), Italian Roman Catholic Bishop of Ragusa
 Alex Rizzo, professional wrestler
 Anthony Rizzo, MLB baseball player
 Antonio Rizzo, Italian footballer
 Carmen Rizzo (born 1964), American producer, mixer, programmer, DJ, remixer and recording artist
 Diletta Rizzo Marin,  Italian operatic mezzo-soprano 
 Francesco Rizzo (footballer) (born 1943), retired Italian football midfielder
 Francisco Rizzo (1831-1910), acting Spanish Governor-General of the Philippines,
 Frank Rizzo, former mayor of Philadelphia, Pennsylvania, US
 Frank Rizzo Jr. (born 1940), American politician
 Frank L. Rizzo, Jr., politician and son of the aforementioned mayor
 Giacomo Rizzo (born 1939),  Italian film actor
 Gianni Rizzo (1925-1992), Italian film actor
 Giuseppe Rizzo (born 1991), Italian footballer
 Giuseppe Rizzo (priest) (1863-1912), Italian priest, politician and journalist
 Gonzalo Nicolás Rizzo Sánchez (born 1995), Uruguayan football defender
 Helena Rizzo (born 1978), Brazilian chef and restaurateuse
 Jessica Rizzo, pornographic actress and businesswoman
 Jilly Rizzo (1917-1992), American restaurateur and associate of Frank Sinatra
 Jo-Ann Rizzo (born 1965), Canadian curler
 Joe Rizzo (American football) (born 1950), Denver Broncos linebacker from 1974 to 1980
 Joe Rizzo (baseball) (born 1998), American baseball player
 John A. Rizzo (1947–2021), American lawyer and intelligence officer
 John Rizzo (politician) (born 1980), American Democratic member of the Missouri Senate since 2017
 John-Ross Rizzo, American physician-scientist 
 Johnny Costa Rizzo (1912-1977), American outfielder in Major League Baseball
 Joseph Rizzo an 18th-century philosopher and theologian from Malta
 Juan Salvador Rizzo (1906, dat eof death unknown), Argentine professional football player
 Linda Jo Rizzo (born 1955), American singer, composer and musical producer
 Luca Rizzo (born 1992), Italian professional footballer
 Luigi Rizzo, Italian naval officer and World War I hero
 Marc Rizzo, current lead guitarist of Brazilian Metal band Soulfly and formerly of Ill Niño
 Marco Rizzo, Italian politician
 Matteo Rizzo (born 1998),  Italian figure skater
 Mauro Rizzo (born 1940), Italian footballer
 Michele Rizzo (born 1982), Italian rugby union player
 Mike Rizzo, DJ and music producer
 Mike Rizzo (baseball), baseball executive
 Rita Rizzo, an American Franciscan nun known as Mother Angelica, founder of the Eternal Word Television Network
 Nick Rizzo, Australian footballer
 Nick Rizzo (curler) (born 1961), Canadian curler 
 Pat Rizzo, saxophonist for Sly & the Family Stone
 Patti Rizzo (born 1960), American professional golfer 
 Paul Rizzo (born 1982), Australian Michael Jackson tribute artist 
 Pedro Rizzo,  Brazilian mixed martial artist and kickboxer
 Rob Rizzo, NASCAR driver
 Robert Hunecke-Rizzo (born 1971), German bass player, guitarist and drummer
 Roberto Rizzo (born 1961),  former Italian football midfielder and current manager
 Simone Rizzo DeCavalcante (1912-1997), Italian member of the New Jersey Mafia, nicknamed "The Count"
 Sócrates Rizzo, Mexican politician
 Steve Rizzo, American motivational speaker, author, and former stand-up comedian
 Tatiana Rizzo (born 1986), Argentine volleyball player
 Todd Rizzo (born 1971), retired Major League Baseball pitcher
 Tony Rizzo (born 1940), Canadian politician
 TJ Rizzo (1915-1979), American dance instructor and founder of the University of Utah Children's Dance 
 Turu Rizzo (1894-1967), Maltese Olympic water polo player and world record swimmer 
 Walter Rizzo (born 1956) champion Australian bodybuilder 
 Willy Rizzo (1928-2013), Italian photographer and designer. 

Fictional characters
 Betty Rizzo, character from the musical Grease and the popular film version played by Stockard Channing
 Frank Rizzo, the acerbic and profane character portrayed by Johnny Brennan
 Luther Rizzo, character from the television series M*A*S*H
 Stan Rizzo, character from the AMC television series Mad Men
 Enrico "Ratso" Rizzo, character from the film Midnight Cowboy
 Deputy Frank Rizzo, character from Reno 911!.
Rizzo the Rat, from The Muppets.

Other uses 
 Anthony Rizzo Family Foundation, a 501(c)(3) non-profit organization established in Parkland, Florida, in 2012 by Anthony Rizzo
 City of Bell scandal, one of the protagonists in a case of  misappropriation of public funds in Bell, CA, in the late 2000s
 People v. Rizzo, a criminal case that set precedent for what constitutes an attempt to commit a crime
 Re Rizzo & Rizzo Shoes Ltd, a 1998 judgment from the Supreme Court of Canada regarding the priority of employees interests

See also
Rizo, a surname

References

Italian-language surnames
Surnames of Italian origin